Batwar is an area of Salarzai Tehsil, in Bajaur District, Khyber Pakhtunkhwa province, Pakistan. The population is 5,267 according to the 2017 census.

References 

Populated places in Bajaur District